Era's Lucknow Medical College is a private medical college in Lucknow, Uttar Pradesh, India, established in 1997. Till 2016, it was affiliated with Dr. Ram Manohar Lohia Avadh University. Since 2016, the college has been affiliated to the Era University.

ELMC&H is a leading medical college for undergraduate as well as postgraduate medical education and advanced training of Doctors, nurses and allied health professionals. It has been recognized as one of the best in the country and is consistently ranked among the Top Medical Colleges of India by various leading  survey agencies. 

ELMC is amongst the top 4.3% medical colleges of India that are involved in advanced medical research. The Research cell, empowered by numerous national and international research collaborations promotes and coordinates various research activities and bi-annually publishes Era’s Journal of Medical Research (EJMR), a multidisciplinary journal. It has published more than 1622 research articles in national and international journals in the last nine years.

ERA is the country's first medical institute to establish a Department of Personalized and Molecular Medicine. It received the prestigious SKOCH award (silver) 2019 for implementing and seamlessly executing the government of India's Ayushmann Bharat Scheme and also SKOCH award (gold) 2020 for Response to Covid.

Notable faculty
Rajendra Prasad, Dr. B. C. Roy Award laureate (2010)

Notable alumni
Sanghmitra Maurya, MP

References

Universities and colleges in Lucknow
Medical colleges in Uttar Pradesh
Educational institutions in India with year of establishment missing